Pedro de Ataíde Inferno was the 8th Captain-major of Portuguese Ceylon. Inferno was appointed in 1564 under Sebastian of Portugal, he was Captain-major until 1565. He was succeeded by Diogo de Melo.

References

Captain-majors of Ceilão
16th-century Portuguese people